Herzog is an indie rock band from Cleveland, Ohio formed in 2010. Their music has been described as "subtlety-free rock," and has been compared to Cloud Nothings, whose bassist, TJ Duke, formerly played in Herzog. The band's frontman, Nick Tolar, graduated from Saint Ignatius High School in 2000. They became well known when NPR chose the song "Silence" from their debut album Search as a song of the year in 2011. Their third album, Boys, was released on May 20, 2014. Dan Price, the band's drummer, has said that its music resembles Weezer and the other '90's bands he and his bandmates grew up listening to. He has also said that Boys is the best representation of his band's sound yet.

Discography

Albums
Search (2010) - Transparent Records, later re-released on Exit Stencil on February 8, 2011
Cartoon Violence (2012) - Exit Stencil Recordings
Boys (2014) - Exit Stencil Recordings
Me Vs. You (2019) - Exit Stencil Recordings
Fiction Writer (2021) - Exit Stencil Recordings

Singles
Georgia / Paul Blart and the Death of Art (split single with Yuck, only 300 copies were made) (2010) - Transparent Records
Mad Men (2014)  - Exit Stencil Recordings
Slow Days / Arizona (split single with Chomp) (2014) - Exit Stencil Recordings

References

 

2010 establishments in Ohio
Indie rock musical groups from Ohio
Musical groups from Cleveland
Musical groups established in 2010